Hawthorn Leadership School for Girls is a public all girls' charter middle and high school in Saint Louis, Missouri. It is chartered by Washington University in St. Louis and has a focus on science, technology, engineering and math (STEM). It is Missouri's first public girls' school.

Mary Stillman, one of the daughters of John Danforth and an alumna of all girls' schools, had conceptualized Hawthorn.

In August 2015 it opened 130 students in grades 6 and 7. A new grade will be added each year until it gets grade 12.

References

Further reading
 "CONSIDERATION OF COMPLIANCE OF CHARTER SCHOOL PROPOSAL: HAWTHORN LEADERSHIP SCHOOL FOR GIRLS" (Archive). Missouri State Board of Education, June 2014.

External links
 Hawthorn Leadership School for Girls

Girls' schools in Missouri
High schools in St. Louis
Educational institutions established in 2015
Charter schools in Missouri
2015 establishments in Missouri
University-affiliated schools in the United States
Washington University in St. Louis